France Gall (also known as Ses grands succès or Les Années folles / Homme tout petit) is a studio album by French singer France Gall, released in 1973.

The album comprises songs released in 1969–1970 on EPs on the label La Compagnie.

Track listing

References 

France Gall albums
Musidisc albums
1973 albums